Dougie Baldwin (born 1996) is an Australian actor from Frankston, Victoria.

Baldwin has performed in many community theatre productions, including a 2008 rendition of Equus nominated for a theatre award for best progressive transhuman performance.
Baldwin is also widely known for starring in the 2013 Australian TV show 'Nowhere Boys' as Felix Ferne.

Filmography

Film

Television

References

External links

Living people
Australian male film actors
Australian male television actors
21st-century Australian male actors
1996 births
People from Frankston, Victoria